"La Vie en Rose" is the debut single by South Korean–Japanese girl group Iz*One, released on October 29, 2018 by Off the Record Entertainment as the lead single from their debut extended play (EP) Color*Iz. It was written, composed and produced by the MosPick Music Producing Group from Cube Entertainment.

Composition

"La Vie en Rose", which is composed in the key of A minor with a tempo of 116 bpm, is described as a vibrant, groovy electropop track. Captivating from the get-go, "La Vie en Rose" blends a wide range of elements – ambient synths, stomping beats, tinny snare and echoing strings drive much of the track – in its attempt at achieving midtempo pop perfection. The melody soars with the members’ vocals, exploding with a pre-chorus build and sudden drop to the more restrained titular hook, serving up an introductory track that is all at once powerful and delicate. The song was composed and produced by the MosPick Music Producing Group from Cube Entertainment which is known for producing successful releases such as 4Minute's "Crazy" and HyunA's "Lip & Hip".

The song was originally intended for K-pop girl group CLC, who had recorded the song for inclusion in their scheduled 2018 comeback.

Music video
On October 29, "La Vie en Rose" was released along with its music video through various sites and music portals, including YouTube, Melon and Naver TV. Directed by VM Project Architecture, the music video is inspired by the color red, with the twelve members seen singing and dancing in red-and-leather outfits, and "counters the more impactful outfits with softer feminine ones".

The music video achieved more than 4.5million views in the first 24 hours of its release on YouTube, surpassing the previous record held by Stray Kids for most views of a K-pop group's debut music video within 24 hours. It exceeded more than 10million views within four days of its release.

Commercial performance
"La Vie en Rose" peaked at number one on three of the South Korean major charts, including Bugs, Soribada and Mnet. The song also topped the iTunes K-pop Singles Chart in two countries and ranked within the top 10 in eight countries.

"La Vie en Rose" debuted at number 6 on the Billboard World Digital Song Sales chart, selling 1,000 downloads in the week ending November 1, 2018, according to Nielsen Music, and was the week's third-biggest-selling K-pop song.

Charts

Accolades

Music program wins

See also 
 List of M Countdown Chart winners (2018)

References

Iz*One songs
2018 debut singles
2018 songs
Korean-language songs